The 1966 Fresno State Bulldogs football team represented Fresno State College—now known as California State University, Fresno—as a member of the California Collegiate Athletic Association (CCAA) during the 1966 NCAA College Division football season. Led by first-year head coach Darryl Rogers, Fresno State compiled an overall record of 7–3 with a mark of 3–2 in conference play, tying for second place in the CCAA. The Bulldogs played home games at Ratcliffe Stadium on the campus of Fresno City College in Fresno, California.

Schedule

Team players in the NFL/AFL
The following were selected in the 1967 NFL Draft.

The following finished their college career in 1966, were not drafted, but played in the AFL.

References

Fresno State
Fresno State Bulldogs football seasons
Fresno State Bulldogs football